Carly Gullickson (born November 26, 1986) is an American former professional tennis player.

Her best singles ranking is No. 123, which she reached in July 2009. Her career-high doubles ranking is No. 52, achieved in April 2006 at age 19.

She is the daughter of former Major League baseball player Bill Gullickson, and the older sister of tennis player Chelsey Gullickson.

Carly won the 2009 US Open mixed-doubles event, partnering with Travis Parrott.
Gullickson retired from tennis in 2013.

She married Australian tennis coach Cameron Eagle. They reside in Palm Beach Gardens, Florida.

Grand Slam finals

Mixed doubles: 1 (1 title)

WTA career finals

Doubles: 3 (2 titles, 1 runner-up)

ITF finals

Singles: 10 (2–8)

Doubles: 24 (18–6)

References

External links
 
 

1986 births
Living people
American female tennis players
People from Palm Beach Gardens, Florida
Tennis people from Florida
Tennis players from Cincinnati
US Open (tennis) champions
Grand Slam (tennis) champions in mixed doubles
Tennis players at the 2003 Pan American Games
Pan American Games competitors for the United States
21st-century American women